Lophophelma eucryphes is a moth of the family Geometridae first described by West in 1930. It is found in the Philippines.

References

Moths described in 1930
Pseudoterpnini